Ullern Church is a parish church of the Church of Norway in Sør-Odal Municipality in Innlandet county, Norway. It is located in the village of Ullern. It is the church for the Ullern parish which is part of the Solør, Vinger og Odal prosti (deanery) in the Diocese of Hamar. The red brick church was built in a long church design in 1869 using plans drawn up by the architect Jacob Wilhelm Nordan. The church seats about 250 people.

History
The earliest existing historical records of the church date back to the year 1394, but the church was not built that day. The first church at Ullern was a wooden stave church that was likely built during the 12th century. In 1623, the old church was torn down and replaced with a new building on the same site. In 1730, the church was torn down and replaced with a new building on the same site.

By the 1860s, the church was too small for the parish, so plans were again made to replace the church with a new building. The architect Jacob Wilhelm Nordan was hired to design the building and Halvor Christoffersen and Marcus Moss were hired as the lead builders for the project. The church was a neo-gothic brick long church with seating for about 250 people. The church was completed and consecrated in 1869. In 1951, the church was restored and many historic pieces were found stored away in the attic such as an altarpiece from 1678, and a pulpit and baptismal font from 1680. These items were restored and placed in the church.

Media gallery

See also
List of churches in Hamar

References

Sør-Odal
Churches in Innlandet
Long churches in Norway
Brick churches in Norway
19th-century Church of Norway church buildings
Churches completed in 1869
12th-century establishments in Norway